Alcides Silveira Vicente Montero (18 March 1938 – 16 January 2011) was a Uruguayan football player and coach who played as a midfielder or centre-back. He played for and coached the Uruguay national team.

Career statistics

International

Scores and results list Uruguay's goal tally first, score column indicates score after each Silveira goal.

Honours
Independiente
 Argentine Primera División: 1960

Boca Juniors
 Argentine Primera División: 1964, 1965

Uruguay
South American Championship: 1959

References

1938 births
2011 deaths
Uruguayan footballers
Association football midfielders
Association football central defenders
Uruguay international footballers
Uruguayan football managers
Uruguayan Primera División players
Argentine Primera División players
La Liga players
Sud América players
Club Atlético Independiente footballers
FC Barcelona players
Boca Juniors footballers
Club Nacional de Football players
Copa América-winning players
Boca Juniors managers
Club Atlético Huracán managers
Club Blooming managers